Norigae is a 2013 South Korean film based on the story of Jang Ja-yeon.  The film depicts the darker side of Korean cinema including the casting couch and sexual abuse.

Min Ji-hyun received a Best New Actress nomination at the 50th Grand Bell Awards in 2013.

Cast
 Ma Dong-seok as Lee Jang-ho
 Lee Seung-yeon as Kim Mi-hyun 
 Min Ji-hyun as Jung Ji-hee
 Lee Do-ah as Go Da-ryung
 Seo Ho-chul as Jung Jin-seok
 Seo Tae-hwa as Lee Sung-ryul
 Gi Ju-bong as Hyun Sung-bong
 Park Yong-soo as Yoon Ki-nam 
 Jang Hyuk-jin as Director Choi Chul-soo
 Kim Kwang-young as Lawyer Kim Gi-seok
 Yang Young-jo as Jin Jong-chul
 Hwang Tae-kwang as Cha Jung-hyuk 
 Byun Yo-han as Park Ji-hoon 
 Song Sam-dong as Oh Jin-tae 
 Kim Dae-heung as Jeon Tae-won 
 Ha Si-eun as Yoo Yeon-soo 
 Kim Won-hee  as Lee Jin-seo 
 Choi Gyo-sik as Subsection chief Gong
 Kim Young-ran as Da-ryung's mother

References

External links 
 
 
 

2013 films
2010s thriller films
South Korean legal films
South Korean thriller films
Films about sexual harassment
South Korean courtroom films
2010s South Korean films